Hypamazso pauli is a species of beetle in the family Cerambycidae, and the only species in the genus Hypamazso. It was described by Fairmaire in 1884.

References

Agapanthiini
Beetles described in 1884
Monotypic beetle genera